The 1920 Memorial Cup final was the second junior ice hockey championship of the Canadian Amateur Hockey Association. The George Richardson Memorial Trophy champions Toronto Canoe Club Paddlers of the Ontario Hockey Association competed against the Abbott Cup champions Selkirk Fishermen of the Manitoba Junior Hockey League. In a two-game, total goal series, held at the Arena Gardens in Toronto, Ontario, Toronto won their first Memorial Cup, defeating Selkirk 15 - 5.

Scores
Game 1: Toronto 10-1 Selkirk
Game 2: Toronto 5-4 Selkirk

Winning roster
Harold Applegath, Billy Burch, Lionel Conacher, Sydney Hueston, Cyril Kelly, Duke McCurry, John Mollenhauer, Frank Moore, Wilfred White, Roy Worters.  Coach: Dick Carroll

References

External links
 Memorial Cup
 Canadian Hockey League

Mem
Ice hockey competitions in Toronto
Memorial Cup tournaments
1920s in Toronto
1920 in Ontario